Shormi Mala is a Bangladeshi stage, television and film actress. She won Bangladesh National Film Award for Best Actress for her role in the film Mrittika Maya (2013).

Career
Mala got involved in acting with the theater troupe Palakar in 2006. She debuted her film career by her role in Moner Manush (2010).

Works
 Moner Manush (2010)
 Mrittika Maya (2013)
 Jalal's Story (2014)
Zindabahar (2022)

References

External links
 

Living people
Bangladeshi film actresses
Bangladeshi television actresses
Bangladeshi stage actresses
Best Actress National Film Awards (Bangladesh) winners
Year of birth missing (living people)